The first season of Love Island Australia began airing on 27 May 2018 9Go! and 9Now presented by Sophie Monk and narrated by Eoghan McDermott. The final aired on 5 July 2018, with Grant Crapp and Tayla Damir winning and sharing the $50,000 prize money. Eden Dally and Erin Barnett finished as runners up.

Format
Love Island involves a group of contestants, referred to as Islanders, living in isolation from the outside world in a villa in Mallorca, Spain, constantly under video surveillance. To survive in the villa the Islanders must be coupled up with another Islander, whether it be for love, friendship or money, as the overall winning couple receives a combined $50,000. On the first day, the Islanders couple up for the first time based on first impressions, but over the duration of the series they are forced to "re-couple" where they can choose to remain in their current couple or swap partners.

Any Islander who remains single after the coupling is eliminated and dumped from the island. Islanders can also be eliminated via public vote, as during the series the public vote through the Love Island app available on smartphones for their favourite couple or prospective couple. Pairs who receive the fewest votes risk being eliminated. Often a twist has occurred where it has been up to the Islanders to vote one of their own off the island. During the final week, the public vote towards which couple they want to win the series and therefore take home $50,000.

Islanders
The Islanders for the first series were released by Nine on 21 May 2018, just one week before the premiere episode.

Future appearances

I'm a Celebrity...Get Me Out of Here!

Season 5 - 
Justin Lacko - 6th Place

Season 6 - 
Erin Barnett - 11th Place

Kory appeared on Season Two of True Love Or True Lies? on MTV

Coupling and elimination history

Notes

Series details

Weekly summary
The main events in the Love Island villa are summarised in the table below.

Reception
Love Island Australia averaged around 200,000 viewers for its linear broadcasts in overnight OzTAM ratings, increasing to an average of 511,000 when adding viewers from Nine's streaming service, 9Now. The series performed strongest in the youngest key demographic band (16 to 39 year olds), but ranked low amongst total viewers. The series generated in excess of 150 million views through its official YouTube channel, however 85% were viewers from outside Australia, and YouTube viewers cannot be monetised.

Viewership

References

9Go! original programming
Nine Network original programming
2018 Australian television seasons
Television shows filmed in Spain